Tenmile Creek is a  tributary of Catskill Creek in Albany County, New York. Via Catskill Creek, it is part of the Hudson River watershed.

Tenmile Creek runs through the villages of Rensselaerville and Medusa in the town of Rensselaerville. The mill house in Medusa stood until the 1980s, when it was destroyed by fire.

Tributaries
Eightmile Creek

See also
List of rivers of New York

References

Rivers of New York (state)
Rivers of Albany County, New York
Rivers of Greene County, New York
Tributaries of the Hudson River